Desiderio Arias Álvarez (1872–1931) was a notable Dominican soldier and caudillo who gained a significant following throughout the northern band of the Dominican Republic, especially in the Montecristi region. He was killed by Rafael Trujillo's forces.

First years 
He was born in 1872, near to Monte Cristi. His parents were Tomas Arias and María Eugenia Álvarez, and his brothers, Evangelista and Francisco. Arias was born during the fourth government of Buenaventura Báez. While still young, he moved to Montecristi, where he soon began working with his relative Juan Isidro Jiménes in the commercial house of J.I. Jiménez & CIA.

Introduction to the militia 
Arias began his first military career with Horacio Vásquez and Ramón Cáceres. Because of his performance and connections, President Juan Isidro Jimenes Pereyra appointed him to the position of regional assistant.

Starts in the politics 
On 1 January 1902, Arias married Simeona Castro, better known as Pomona, sister of the general Andrés Navarro, a known politician and military caudillo of the northwestern band, and one of the key supporters of President Jimenes.

1872 births
1931 deaths
People from Monte Cristi Province
Dominican Republic people of Spanish descent
Dominican Republic politicians
Dominican Republic activists
Dominican Republic military personnel
Assassinated activists
People murdered in the Dominican Republic
Assassinated military personnel
Assassinated Dominican Republic politicians